Emmanuel Foster (4 December 1921 – December 1965) was an English footballer who played in the Football League for Stoke City.

Career
Foster played for Mow Cop before joining Stoke during World War II. He made one appearance for Stoke in the Football League which came in a 3–2 defeat away at Bolton Wanderers in September 1946. Afterwards he left the club for non-league Stafford Rangers.

Career statistics

References

English footballers
Stoke City F.C. players
Stafford Rangers F.C. players
English Football League players
1921 births
1965 deaths
Association football goalkeepers